Göran Stubb (born 10 March 1935) is the National Hockey League (NHL) Director of European Scouting. Stubb began working as the chairman of IFK Helsinki from 1961 to 1975 before joining the Finnish Ice Hockey Association in 1976 as their Managing Director. After serving as the Secretary General for the 1982 Ice Hockey World Championships Stubb began European Sports Service, a European scouting service, in 1983 following urging from Jim Gregory, then Director of NHL Central Scouting. This became the first major European scouting association with the NHL.

In 2000, Stubb was inducted into the IIHF Hall of Fame as a builder.

Personal life
Stubb is the father of politician Alexander Stubb.

References

1935 births
Living people
Finnish ice hockey administrators
Finnish ice hockey people
IIHF Hall of Fame inductees